"Kill Bill" (Hangul: 킬빌) is a song recorded by South Korean girl group Brown Eyed Girls for their fifth studio album Black Box (2013). Named after the eponymous martial arts films by American director Quentin Tarantino, the electro-pop song was written by the group's long time lyricist Kim Eana and Miryo, while member JeA composed and arranged the song under the moniker Candy Sound. Accompanied with a seven-minute long music video that paid homage to the plot of the inspired film, it was released as the second and final single from Black Box on July 29, 2013 by Nega Network and LOEN Entertainment, to coincide with its parental album release.

Upon its release, "Kill Bill" received positive reviews from critics for its "easy-breezy, Western-themed" pop tune and the competence of all members, further praising member Miryo for her rap performance. The song also attained commercial success for the group, becoming their sixth top ten entry on the Gaon Digital Chart, while earning the group their second, and to date, highest entry on the Billboard World Digital Songs chart, peaking at number twelve. To further promote the song, Brown Eyed Girls appeared on several South Korea television music programs to perform the track, along with their previous single "Recipe".

Background and release 
Following the release of "Recipe" on July 9, 2013 to both critical and commercial success, the group released their first image teaser for their upcoming fifth studio album, titled Black Box, on July 23, 2013. A music video teaser was released three days later, confirming the group's next single to be "Kill Bill". Along with the digital release of its parental album, the seven-minute length music video for the single was released on July 29, 2013, while a performance video was later released on August 2, 2013.

Composition 

"Kill Bill" was written by the group's long time lyricist Kim Eana and member Miryo, while production and arrangement was handled by member JeA under her moniker Candy Sound. A dominant electro-pop and dance-pop track, the song begins with an "addictive whistle hook", thus portraying the old Western movie reflection. It also draws comparisons to the work of Dr. Luke by Jeff Benjamin of Billboard, citing its "crunchy synths and lively guitar strumming" with knocking beat as the prime elements. Running a total length of three minutes and twenty-six seconds, it follows the common verse-chorus form, and is composed in the key of D♭ major with a tempo of 128 beat-per-minute. Lyrically, the song is heavily themed around the titular martial arts film by American director Quentin Tarantino, telling the story of a woman "mocking" the man who did her wrong, further "laughing" at his despair that their relationship is over with the hook "So don't you want to kill me?", performed by member Miryo.

Charts and performance
The song was released to various digital outlets in 2013, after which it quickly topped various online charts.

References

External links
 Official fansite 

2013 songs
2013 singles
Brown Eyed Girls songs
Songs with lyrics by Kim Eana
Korean-language songs
Kakao M singles